Duan Yunzi (born 24 January 1995) is a Chinese footballer currently playing as a forward or midfielder for Wuhan Three Towns.

Club career
Duan Yunzi would be promoted to the senior team of Dalian Yifang and go on to make his debut in a 2014 Chinese FA Cup game on 15 July 2014 against Yanbian Baekdu in a 2-0 defeat. To gain more playing time he was loaned out to newly promoted third tier club Shenyang Urban on 9 March 2016. He would extend his loan at Shenyang Urban before joining another third tier club in Sichuan Longfor on loan for the 2018 China League Two league season, where he went on to establish himself as vital player as the club gained promotion when they won the division title without losing a single game. On 9 March 2018 he would join them on a permanent basis. He would go on to continue to be a vital member of the team as he was able to keep them within the division and avoid relegation, however the club was dissolved after they failed to submit the salary & bonus confirmation form before the 2020 season.

On 5 August 2020, Duan was free to move to third tier club Wuhan Three Towns. In his first season with the club he would go on to aid them in winning the division title and promotion into the second tier. This would be followed by another division title win and promotion as the club entered the top tier for the first tine in their history. The following campaign he would be part of the squad that won the 2022 Chinese Super League title.

Career statistics
.

Notes

Honours

Club
Sichuan Longfor
China League Two: 2018

Wuhan Three Towns
Chinese Super League: 2022.
China League One: 2021
China League Two: 2020

References

External links
Duan Yunzi at Worldfootball.net

1995 births
Living people
Chinese footballers
China youth international footballers
Association football forwards
China League Two players
China League One players
Dalian Professional F.C. players
Liaoning Shenyang Urban F.C. players
Sichuan Longfor F.C. players
Wuhan Three Towns F.C. players
21st-century Chinese people